The Cape York meteorite, also known as the Innaanganeq meteorite, is one of the largest known iron meteorites, classified as a medium octahedrite in chemical group IIIAB. In addition to many small fragments, at least eight large fragments with a total mass of 58 tons have been recovered, the largest weighing .

The date of the meteorite fall is debated, but was likely within the last few thousand years. It was known to the Inughuit (the local Inuit) for centuries, who used it as a source of meteoritic iron for tools. The first foreigner to reach the meteorite was Robert Peary in 1894, with the assistance of Inuit guides. Large pieces are on display at the American Museum of Natural History and the University of Copenhagen Geological Museum.

History
The meteorite fell to Earth after the retreat of glaciers from the area. All fragments recovered were found at the surface, partly buried, some on unstable terrain. The largest fragment was recovered in an area where the landscape consists of "flowing" gravel or clay-like sediments on permafrost, indicating that it had been in place for no more than a few thousand years. Other estimates have put the date of the fall as 10,000 years ago.

The iron masses were known to Inuit as Saviksoah (Great Iron, later renamed Ahnighito by Robert Edwin Peary) weighing ; the Woman, weighing ; and the Dog, weighing . For centuries, Inuit living near the meteorites used them as a source of metal for tools and harpoons. The Inuit would work the metal using cold forging—that is, by hammering the metal with stones. Excavations of a Norse farm in 1976 located an arrowhead made of iron from the meteorite, dating from the 11th to 14th century AD; its presence is evidence of Norse journeys to northern Greenland.

In 1818, the British First Ross Expedition (led by Captain John Ross) made contact with Inuit on the northern shore of Melville Bay, who stated they had settled in the area to exploit a nearby source of iron. The Inuit described the location of this iron, but poor weather and sea ice prevented Ross from investigating further. Ross correctly surmised that the large iron rocks described by the Inuit were meteorites, and purchased several tools with blades made of the meteoritic iron.

Between 1818 and 1883, five further expeditions to the area were mounted by Britain, Sweden, and Denmark, which all failed to find the source of the iron. Only in 1894 did a Western explorer reach the meteorite: Robert E. Peary, of the US Navy. Peary enlisted the help of a local Inuit guide, who brought him to Saviksoah Island, just off northern Greenland's Cape York. Peary dedicated three years to planning and executing the removal of the meteorite, a process which required the building of a short railroad. Peary sold the pieces for $40,000 (equivalent to $ in ) to the American Museum of Natural History in New York City, where they are still on display. 

Today the  piece named Ahnighito is on display in the Arthur Ross Hall of the American Museum of Natural History. Ahnighito is the second-heaviest meteorite to have been relocated (behind the 37-tonne El Chaco). It is so heavy that it was necessary to build its display stand so that the supports reached directly to the bedrock below the museum.

Other smaller pieces have also been found, such as the  Savik I meteorite found in 1911 and the  Tunorput fragment found in 1984. Surveys of the area with a magnetometer in 2012 and georadar in 2014 found no evidence of further large iron fragments, either buried or on the surface.

Specimens

Each of the most important fragments of Cape York has its own name (listed in order of discovery date by foreigners):

 Ahnighito (the Tent), 1884–1897, Meteorite Island, 76°04'N – 64°58'W
 Woman, 1897, Saveruluk, 76°09'N – 64°56'W
 Dog, 1897, Saveruluk, 76°09'N – 64°56'W
 Savik I, 1913, Savequarfik, 76°08'N – 64°36'W
 Thule, summer 1955, Thule, 76°32'N – 67°33'W
 Savik II, 1961, Savequarfik, 76°08'N – 64°36'W
 Agpalilik (the Man), 1963, Agpalilik, 76°09'N – 65°10'W
 Tunorput, 1984

Composition and classification 
It is an iron meteorite (medium octahedrite) and belongs to the chemical group IIIAB.
There are abundant elongated troilite nodules. The troilite nodules contain inclusions of chromite, sulfides, phosphates, silica and copper. The rare nitride mineral carlsbergite (CrN) occurs within the matrix of the metal phase. Graphite was not observed and the nitrogen isotopes are in disequilibrium.

In popular culture
 In the manga and anime series JoJo's Bizarre Adventure, the Diamond is Unbreakable and Golden Wind story arcs prominently feature a set of six arrows which are made out of meteoric iron sourced from the Cape York meteorite.

See also
 Glossary of meteoritics
 History of ferrous metallurgy
 List of largest meteorites on Earth
 Archaeometallurgy
 Inuit culture
 Meteoric iron

References

Bibliography
Patricia A. M. Huntington. Robert E Peary and the Cape York meteorites

External links

 American Museum of Natural History
 www.meteoritestudies.com
Cape York on the Meteoritical Bulletin Database

Meteorites found in Greenland
Geology of Greenland
History of metallurgy